Cavanosteus is an extinct genus of homostiid arthrodire from the Emsian of Victoria, and New South Wales, Australia.

Description 
Cavanosteus is known from central plates of the skull, infragnathals with little or no dentition, similar in form to Homosteus, and a bone from the dermal trunk shield.

References

Homostiidae
Arthrodire genera
Fossil taxa described in 1876
Taxa named by Frederick McCoy
Placoderms of Australia